Kollo  is a department of the Tillabéri Region in Niger. Its capital lies at the city of Kollo, and includes the towns of  N'Dounga, Fakara, Hamdallaye, Karma, Kirtachi, Kouré, Lamordé, Liboré, and Namaro. As of 2011, the department had a total population of 443,371 people.

References

Portions of this article were translated from the French language Wikipedia article :fr:Tillabéri (région), 2008-06-19.

Departments of Niger
Tillabéri Region